Horatio Chriesman (August 13, 1797 – November 1, 1878) was an American surveyor, politician in Mexican Texas and participant in the Texas Revolution.

Born in Virginia, he became a surveyor in Kentucky, Missouri and Texas.

Chriesman served as mayor of San Felipe, Texas, and later on the committee to find a capital for the Republic of Texas.

Two towns have been named in his honor in Texas.

Early life
Chriesman was born on August 13, 1797, in Virginia.

Career
He served as a surveyor in Kentucky and Missouri. In 1821, shortly after his wife died, he left Missouri for Texas with his father-in-law, William Kincheloe (1779–1835), aboard the schooner Only Son. They arrived on the Colorado River on June 19, 1822.

Chriesman became a member of the Old Three Hundred after Stephen F. Austin succeeded his father, Moses Austin, as empresario. Becoming the first to plot the headright Spanish grants on February 10, 1823, he continued until Stephen F. Austin's death in 1836.

He surveyed the Jack League, in what is now Fayette County, which was purchased in 1843 by the German immigration company Adelsverein as a slave plantation. It was named Nassau Plantation after the Duke of Nassau.

Chriesman fought against Native Americans as captain of the colonial militia in 1824. A few years later, in 1826–1827, he served in the Fredonian Rebellion, European settlers' first attempt to secede from Mexico.

He was elected as mayor of San Felipe, Texas in 1832. Later that year, he was an attendee of the Convention of 1832.

In 1835, Chriesman lost the election as regidor of Washington-on-the-Brazos, Texas. A year later, he attended the Convention of 1836 in Washington-on-the-Brazos.

In 1836, as he was moving East towards the Trinity River, he heard about the Battle of San Jacinto and decided to serve in the Texas Revolution. As a result, he enlisted as captain in the 2nd company of the 141st Infantry Regiment.

Serving on a committee to help choose the new Republic of Texas seat of government in 1837, Chriesman proposed a site near Washington-on-the-Brazos at what is now Gay Hill in Washington County. He was willing to donate four Labors of land (approximately 700 acres) for the capital of the Republic of Texas. Austin was eventually chosen as the seat of government.

In 1840, Chriesman was one of nine trustees who incorporated the Republic's first private institution of learning, the Union Academy in Washington-on-the-Brazos.

He retired in Burleson County, Texas.

Personal life and death
Chriesman married Mary Kincheloe in 1818. She died in New Madrid, Missouri, in 1821. In 1825, he married Augusta Hope. He had eleven children.

Chriesman died on November 1, 1878 in Burleson County, Texas.

Legacy
The town of Chriesman, Texas, in Burleson County is named in his honor.
The ghost town of Gay Hill in Washington County, Texas, was known as "Chriesman Settlement" until it was renamed by the Republic of Texas in 1840.

References

1797 births
1878 deaths
American founders
American militiamen
American surveyors
Death in Texas
Founders of educational institutions
Old Three Hundred
Mayors of places in Mexico
People from Austin County, Texas
People from Burleson County, Texas
People from Washington County, Texas
People from Virginia
People of the Republic of Texas